Barnabás Steinmetz (born 6 October 1975 in Budapest) is a Hungarian water polo player who played on the gold medal squads at the 2000 Summer Olympics and 2004 Summer Olympics. He is nicknamed Barney and Sema, and made his debut for the national team in 1993, at an international tournament in Moscow, Russia. He is currently the player of Vasas SC.

Honours

National
 Olympic Games:  Gold medal - 2000, 2004
 World Championships:  Gold medal - 2003;  Silver medal - 1998
 European Championship:  Gold medal - 1997, 1999;  Silver medal - 1993;  bronze medal - 2001, 2003
 Universiade: (silver medal - 1995)
 Junior World Championships: (gold medal - 1995; bronze medal - 1993)
 Junior European Championship: (gold medal - 1992, 1994)

Club
 Cup Winners' Cup Winners (2): (1998 - with FTC; 2003 - with Posillipo)

 Hungarian Championship (OB I): 5x (2000 - with FTC; 2007, 2008, 2009, 2012 - with Vasas)
 Hungarian Cup (Magyar Kupa): 3x (1996 (2) - with FTC; 2004, 2005 - with Vasas)
  Italian Championship (Serie A1): 1x (2001 - with Posillipo)

Awards
 Member of the Hungarian team of year: 1993, 1997, 1999, 2000, 2003, 2004
 Masterly youth athlete: 1995, 1996
 Papp László Budapest Sportíj (2014)

Orders
   Officer's Cross of the Order of Merit of the Republic of Hungary (2000)
   Commander's Cross of the Order of Merit of the Republic of Hungary (2004)

See also
 Hungary men's Olympic water polo team records and statistics
 List of Olympic champions in men's water polo
 List of Olympic medalists in water polo (men)
 List of world champions in men's water polo
 List of World Aquatics Championships medalists in water polo

References

External links
 

1975 births
Living people
Water polo players from Budapest
Hungarian male water polo players
Water polo centre backs
Water polo players at the 2000 Summer Olympics
Water polo players at the 2004 Summer Olympics
Medalists at the 2000 Summer Olympics
Medalists at the 2004 Summer Olympics
Olympic gold medalists for Hungary in water polo
World Aquatics Championships medalists in water polo
Universiade medalists in water polo
Universiade silver medalists for Hungary
Vasas SC water polo players
Hungarian water polo coaches
Medalists at the 1995 Summer Universiade
20th-century Hungarian people
21st-century Hungarian people